Dry Branch is a  long 2nd order tributary to Whitethorn Creek in Pittsylvania County, Virginia.

Course 
Dry Branch rises in a pond about 0.5 miles southeast of Sheva, Virginia and then flows generally northeast to join Whitethorn Creek about 1 mile southwest of Markham.

Watershed 
Dry Branch drains  of area, receives about 45.4 in/year of precipitation, has a wetness index of 545.50, and is about 36% forested.

See also 
 List of Virginia Rivers

References 

Rivers of Virginia
Rivers of Pittsylvania County, Virginia
Tributaries of the Roanoke River